Solieria pacifica is a European species of fly in the family Tachinidae.

References 

Tachininae
Diptera of Europe
Insects described in 1824